Timboroa (also Timbaroa and Tomborou) is a town in Baringo County, Kenya. It is located near the border with Uasin Gishu County with the boundary being the most northwesterly point of Timboroa Forest leading on to Tinderet Forest in a westerly direction. Timboroa lies along the Equator Line. The area is mainly covered with Bamboos Grasses. Other small townships located in Timboroa area are Matharu, Hilloti (Corruption from English Hill Tea), Mumberes, Equator, Makutano, Mlango Moja through to Mlango Tano. The region has been home to a number of notable athletes, both male and female, including Bernard Barmasai.

Administration
The town is administered from Eldama Ravine Division of Koibatek District in former Rift Valley Province. The current area chief for Timboroa location is Mr Jacob Njehia and the assistant chief is Mr Edward Waweru.

Origin of Timboroa name
It acquired its name from Kalenjin word Tim-boroowon which literally means 'a forest full of long ropes', which is the case since Timboroa has thick bamboo forest with natural trees straddled with climbers.

Post election violence
In the civil violence of the aftermath of the 2007 elections, the town was completely destroyed. Timboroa was located just off of the A-104 motorway.

Climate and weather
The town is 9557 ft above the sea level and hence one of the coldest or chilliest area in Kenya comparable with Mt Kenya Region. During the months of June–August thick fog engulfs the entire area. Timboroa is the highest point of the Kenyan Highlands where people live. The Batian peak of Mount Kenya at 17,057 ft is, however, the tallest overall point in Kenya - although it's not habitable unlike the Timboroa Forest.

Agriculture
It is a very rich agricultural area known for potato growing and one can see women selling potatoes at the road side. The place is known for potatoes such as 'shangii' and Nyayo. Many farmers rear Merino sheep. It was a major pyrethrum growing area before 2000 before pyrethrum prices became unbearably low.

Broadcast transmitter sites

The Timboroa television and FM radio station broadcasts from the mountain to the south of the town.

Education
Timboroa is home to several primary and secondary schools including the oldest primary school in the region, Timboroa Primary School which was started in 1908. Other Primary schools include nyakio primary school, Matharu primary school Kamura primary school, Tarigo primary school, Emmanuel junior academy and several secondary schools such as timboroa boys secondary, kamura day secondary, st Mary's Boito mixed day secondary school among others.

References

Populated places in Rift Valley Province